W. K. Buckley Limited is a corporation operating in Canada that manufactures medicines for health problems such as the common cold. They also have children's medicine which are sold under the brand Jack & Jill. The company is located in Mississauga, Ontario. It is a subsidiary of Novartis.

The company was founded in 1919 by William Knapp Buckley (1890 - 1978), In 1978, after W. K. Buckley's death, his adopted son Frank Buckley became the president of the company. In the mid-1980s, Frank became spokesperson promoting the "It Tastes Awful. And It Works." slogan, which became very successful.

Novartis purchased ownership of the Buckley's brand and formulas in 2002.

The remaining Buckley company, William Knapp Limited, which provides Marketing consultancy services, is led by David Rieger, the Vice President of Marketing reporting directly to Frank Buckley. Prior to this position, Mr. Rieger held a number of other senior positions with the Buckley organization and with the Novartis conglomerate.

Buckley's Mixture 
Buckley's Original Mixture is a cough syrup invented in 1919 in Toronto, Ontario, Canada , and still produced today. Noted for its strongly unpleasant taste (hence its slogan), its ingredients include ammonium carbonate, potassium bicarbonate, camphor, menthol, Canada balsam (Abies balsamea), sodium cyclamate, pine needle oil, and a tincture of capsicum. It is promoted for relief of coughs and sore throats for up to six hours.

In March 2017, Health Canada issued a recall of Buckley’s products due to a choking hazard from a faulty plastic seal.

As of 2019, five other Buckley's cough syrups are produced. Buckley's DM, which contained dextromethorphan, is no longer produced for sale in Canada as of 2016.

See also 
 Antitussive
 Cough

External links

References 

Pharmaceutical companies of Canada
Pharmaceutical companies established in 1919